CW 27 may refer to:

In television:
 The CW 27 or KWBH-LD, a cable channel licensed to Rapid City, South Dakota, USA
 The CW 27 or WGNT, a cable channel licensed to Portsmouth, Virginia, USA

In  other uses:
CW-27 Caravan, a 1940s American all-wood military transport aircraft
(8948) 1997 CW27, a main-belt minor planet

Broadcast call sign disambiguation pages